The 2015 Red Bull Air Race of Ascot was the fifth round of the 2015 Red Bull Air Race World Championship season, the tenth season of the Red Bull Air Race World Championship. The event was held at the Ascot Racecourse in the United Kingdom.

Championship leader Paul Bonhomme took his third victory of the 2015 season, as he was the only pilot of the four finalists to set a time without recording any penalties. He finished 2.6 seconds clear of Matt Hall, with Yoshihide Muroya completing the podium. In the Challenger class, Petr Kopfstein took his second win, 1.144 seconds ahead of Cristian Bolton. Daniel Ryfa had finished quickest, but was given a two-second penalty, and therefore dropped to third.

Master Class

Qualification

Round of 14

 Pilot received 2 seconds in penalties.
 Pilot received 3 seconds in penalties.

Round of 8

Final 4

Challenger Class

Results

Standings after the event

Master Class standings

Challenger Class standings

 Note: Only the top five positions are included for both sets of standings.

References

External links

|- style="text-align:center"
|width="35%"|Previous race:2015 Red Bull Air Race of Budapest
|width="30%"|Red Bull Air Race2015 season
|width="35%"|Next race:2015 Red Bull Air Race of Spielberg
|- style="text-align:center"
|width="35%"|Previous race:2014 Red Bull Air Race of Ascot
|width="30%"|Red Bull Air Race of Ascot
|width="35%"|Next race:2016 Red Bull Air Race of Ascot
|- style="text-align:center"

Ascot
Red Bull Air Race World Championship
Red Bull Air Race World Championship